Royall Tyler (born 1936) is a scholar, writer, and translator of Japanese literature. Notable works of his include English translations of The Tale of the Heike (平家物語, Heike Monogatari) which won the 2012 Lois Roth Award, as well as The Tale of Genji (源氏物語, Genji Monogatari) which was awarded the Japan-US Friendship Commission Translation Prize in 2001. Tyler's first book of poetry was published in 2014, entitled A Great Valley Under the Stars, and his published collection of poetry, Under Currockbilly which recounts his life during the year 2014, suggests he has spent periods of his life in France, Japan, the United States, Australia, and elsewhere.

Academic career 
Tyler completed his B.A. in Far Eastern Languages at Harvard University in 1957. He then obtained a master's degree in Japanese history and PhD in Japanese literature at Columbia University where he was supervised by Donald Keene, a well known scholar of Japanese literature. He was a professor and head of the Japan Centre in the faculty of Asian Studies at the Australian National University in Canberra from 1992 until retiring in 2000 in rural Australia with his wife, Susan Tyler. Earlier in his academic career, he taught Japanese language and culture at Harvard, the University of Wisconsin-Madison, and the University of Oslo, Norway.

He has translated and wrote several Noh plays which helped in introducing Noh theatre to non-Japanese audiences. And in 2001 he received Japan-US Friendship Commission Translation Prize for his translation of the complete Tale of Genji (源氏物語, Genji Monogatari) text, a project that took eight years to complete and had been the third ever attempt at translating the tale to the English language.

Tyler currently self-publishes his works under his own imprint, Blue-Tongue Books, and continues to host lectures at international seminars and symposiums. Tyler's current working project is titled Continuing with Accounts of the Japanese 14th Century, which does not yet have a release date.

Personal life 
Tyler is a descendant of two other authors named Royall Tyler, one being American playwright Royall Tyler (1757–1826) best known for their work The Contrast, and the other his grandfather Royall Tyler (1884-1953), a diplomat and scholar. He was born in London, England, and grew up in the United States and then in France during his high school years. Tyler now lives in rural New South Wales with his wife on a farm in New South Wales, 100 acres beyond Mongarlowe by Braidwood and at the western foot of Mount Currockbilly, which provided inspiration for his published 2016 collection of poems Under Currockbilly.

In 1993, Tyler and his wife purchased several alpacas and brought them to their property, managing a farm and breeding and showing alpacas for twenty years until 2013 when they sold the majority of their herd, although they continue to live on their farm with a few of their animals. Tyler is also a practiced spinner along with his wife, making yarn from the alpaca fleece for over ten years and bringing their refined fabric products to national shows.

Currently retired, he continues to publish books and personal works under his own book imprint titled Blue-Tongue Books which is named after the blue-tongue skinks that would populate the surrounding of his and his wife's farm during the summertime.

Honors
 Order of the Rising Sun, Gold Rays with Neck Ribbon, 2008
 Japan Foundation: Japan Foundation Award, 2007
 Japan-U.S. Friendship Commission Translation Prize, 2001
 Lois Roth Award, 2012.

Selected Works and Translations 
 Japanese Tales, Pantheon, 1987
 French Folktales, Pantheon, 1989
 Japanese Nô Dramas, Penguin, 1990
 The Miracles of the Kasuga Deity, Columbia University Press, 1992
 The Tale of Genji, Viking, 2001 (hardback) and Penguin, 2002 (paper)
 Mistress Oriku: Stories from a Tokyo Teahouse by Kawaguchi Matsutarô, Tuttle, 2007
 The Glass Slipper and Other Stories by Yasuoka Shôtarô, Dalkey Archive Press, 2008
 The Ise Stories: Ise monogatari, University of Hawai'i Press, 2010 (with Joshua Mostow)
 Flowers of Grass by Fukunaga Takehiko, Dalkey Archive Press, 2012
 The Tale of the Heike, Penguin, 2012
 A Great Valley Under the Stars, Isobar Press, 2014
 Before Heike and After: Hogen, Heiji, Jokyuki, Blue-Tongue Books, 2016
 From the Bamboo-View Pavilion: Takemuki-ga-ki, Blue-Tongue Books, 2016
 From Baishōron to Nantaiheiki, Blue-Tongue Books, 2016
 A Reading of The Tale of Genji, Blue-Tongue Books, 2016
 To Hallow Genji: A Tribute to Noh, Blue-Tongue Books, 2017
 Iwashimizu Hachiman in War and Cult, Blue-Tongue Books, 2017
 Henri Pourrat and Le Trésor des Contes, Blue-Tongue Books, 2020
 The Castelvecchio Family, by William R. Tyler (formatted and supplemented). 2014
 One Name, Two Lives. Blue-Tongue Books, 2017
 A Great Valley under the Stars. Isobar Press, 2014
 Under Currockbilly. Blue-Tongue Books, 2016

References

1936 births
Living people
Columbia Graduate School of Arts and Sciences alumni
Harvard College alumni
Japanese literature academics
Japanese–English translators
Recipients of the Order of the Rising Sun, 3rd class